Unterperfuss is a municipality in the district of Innsbruck-Land in the Austrian state of Tyrol located 15 km west of Innsbruck and is one of the smallest villages of Tyrol. The area is restricted in the north by the Inn River and in the east by the Melach River. Unterperfuss has many facilities for horse-riding.

Population

Geography 
Unterperfuss is located in the Inn Valley, about 15 km west of Innsbruck, opposite Zirl. With an area of two square kilometers and about 200 inhabitants, it is one of the smallest municipalities in Tyrol. The municipal boundaries are formed in the north by the Inn River and in the east by the Melach River, which flows here from the Sellrain Valley.

History 
Unterperfuss became its own tax municipality in 1780. In the cadastre of that time, eleven houses are listed, ten of which were farms that were subject to the Stams monastery. There were also two mills and a sawmill. Forests are mentioned as community property, which were reserved for water protection structures on the Inn and Melach rivers. The family names at that time were Härtnagl, Mayr, Maizner, Wolf, Schiz, Hofer, Schaffenrath, Klaisner, Pranger and Fiz.

References

External links

Cities and towns in Innsbruck-Land District